João Neto (born 11 March 1958) is an Angolan sailor. He competed in the Finn event at the 1992 Summer Olympics.

References

External links
 

1958 births
Living people
Angolan male sailors (sport)
Olympic sailors of Angola
Sailors at the 1992 Summer Olympics – Finn
Place of birth missing (living people)